Potamon is a genus of freshwater or semiterrestrial crabs mainly found from Southern Europe through the Middle East, and as far east as north-western India. The only exception is the North African P. algeriense, which also is the only potamid of mainland Africa. Twenty species are currently recognised:. These crabs are omnivores that have a broad ecological tolerance. The adult Potaman reach up to 50 mm in size during their 10-12 year life span. 

Potamon algeriense 
Potamon bileki 
Potamon bilobatum 
Potamon fluviatile 
Potamon gedrosianum 
Potamon hueceste 
Potamon ibericum 
Potamon magnum 
Potamon mesopotamicum 
Potamon monticola 
Potamon pelops 
Potamon persicum 
Potamon potamios 
Potamon rhodium 
Potamon ruttneri 
Potamon setigerum 
Potamon strouhali 
Potamon transcaspicum 
Potamon ilam 
Potamon elbursi 

Many other taxa from Indochina, originally described as species of Potamon, are now placed in other genera, such as Himalayapotamon, Beccumon, Eosamon, and Takpotamon.

References

Potamoidea
Taxa named by Marie Jules César Savigny
Decapod genera